Martín Eugenio Brignani (born 10 May 1972) is an Argentine football manager and former player who played as a midfielder.

Playing career
Born in Mar del Plata, Brignani played for Amateur local sides such as CA San Lorenzo Mar del Plata and Alvarado before moving to Venezuela in 1997, with Estudiantes de Mérida. In 2000, he joined Caracas, and played in the Copa Libertadores with the club.

Brignani subsequently represented Maracaibo and Deportivo Pereira before returning to Estudiantes de Mérida in 2002. He played for two seasons with San Martín SJ back in his home country before returning to Venezuela in 2005, with Trujillanos.

Back to his home country in 2007, Brignani played for lower league sides CA Talleres de Mar del Plata, CA General Urquiza, San Isidro (two stints) and CA El Cañón.

Managerial career
In July 2014, Brignani was named manager of San Isidro. In 2016, he was in charge of another of his former teams, San Lorenzo de Mar del Plata. Subsequently, he worked at a Boca Juniors school in his hometown.

On 19 June 2018, Brignani was appointed at the helm of Estudiantes de Mérida. While at the club, he won the 2019 Apertura but lost the final to Caracas.

During the 2020 season, due to the COVID-19 pandemic, Brignani returned to his native Mar del Plata but could not return to Venezuela to manage the club in the 2020 Copa Libertadores due to the restrictions in Argentina. He managed the club through Zoom, while his assistant was on the field.

On 8 January 2021, Brignani resigned from Estudiantes, and was appointed at Deportivo Lara late in the month. He was sacked on 31 July, with the club outside the qualification zones.

On 10 August 2022, Brignani returned to Venezuela after being named manager of Portuguesa. He was sacked the following 1 March, after winning only one point out of nine into the new season.

References

External links

1972 births
Living people
Sportspeople from Mar del Plata
Argentine footballers
Association football midfielders
Club Atlético Alvarado players
San Martín de San Juan footballers
Club Atlético San Isidro football players
Venezuelan Primera División players
Estudiantes de Mérida players
Caracas FC players
UA Maracaibo players
Trujillanos FC players
Deportivo Pereira footballers
Argentine expatriate footballers
Argentine expatriate sportspeople in Venezuela
Argentine expatriate sportspeople in Colombia
Expatriate footballers in Venezuela
Expatriate footballers in Colombia
Argentine football managers
Venezuelan Primera División managers
Estudiantes de Mérida managers
Asociación Civil Deportivo Lara managers
Portuguesa F.C. managers
Argentine expatriate football managers
Expatriate football managers in Venezuela